Loch Lomond is a census-designated place (CDP) in Prince William County, Virginia, United States. The population was 3,701 at the 2010 census.  It is named after a loch in northern Scotland, Loch Lomond.

Geography
Loch Lomond is located at  (38.780614, −77.482188).

According to the United States Census Bureau, the CDP has a total area of 0.7 square miles (1.9 km2), all of it land.

Demographics
As of the census of 2000, there were 3,411 people, 1,048 households, and 865 families residing in the CDP. The racial makeup of the CDP was 79.39% White, 7.01% African American, 0.26% Native American, 2.11% Asian, 0.06% Pacific Islander, 8.88% from other races, and 2.29% from two or more races. Hispanic or Latino of any race were 14.10% of the population.

There were 1,048 households, out of which 40.4% had children under the age of 18 living with them, 69.6% were married couples living together, 8.2% had a female householder with no husband present, and 17.4% were non-families. 13.1% of all households were made up of individuals, and 3.9% had someone living alone who was 65 years of age or older. The average household size was 3.25 and the average family size was 3.51.

In the CDP, the population was spread out, with 29.3% under the age of 18, 7.6% from 18 to 24, 31.5% from 25 to 44, 23.9% from 45 to 64, and 7.6% who were 65 years of age or older. The median age was 35 years. For every 100 females, there were 106.9 males. For every 100 females age 18 and over, there were 104.1 males.

The median income for a household in the CDP was $69,674, and the median income for a family was $70,970. Males had a median income of $40,177 versus $34,402 for females. The per capita income for the CDP was $21,604. About 6.2% of families and 7.3% of the population were below the poverty line, including 11.5% of those under age 18 and none of those age 65 or over.

The residents of Loch Lomond are represented in the Virginia House of Delegates by Danica Roem.

References

Census-designated places in Prince William County, Virginia
Washington metropolitan area
Census-designated places in Virginia